Moris may refer to:

People

Given name
 Moris Carrozzieri (born 1980), Italian footballer
 Moris Farhi (born 1935), Turkish author, vice-president of International PEN
 Moris Pfeifhofer (born 1988), Swiss figure skater
 Moris (singer) (born Mauricio Birabent in 1942), Argentine guitarist
 Moris Tepper (21st century), U.S. singer, songwriter, guitarist, and painter

Surname
 Anthony Moris (born 1990), Belgian footballer
            Giuseppe Giacinto Moris (1796–1869), Italian botanist

Places
 Moris Municipality, Chihuahua, Mexico
 Moris, Chihuahua, Mexican town
Moris, island of Mauritius in the local language (creole)

Other
 Arte Moris, fine arts school in East Timor.

See also
 Morris (disambiguation)
 Morus (disambiguation)
 Mori (disambiguation)